Salihundam, is a village and panchayat in Gara Mandal of Srikakulam district in Andhra Pradesh. It is a historically important Buddhist monument of ancient Kalinga and a major tourist attraction It is a village lying on top of the hill on the south bank of the Vamsadhara River. It is at a distance of 5 KM west to Kalingapatnam and 10 KM from Singupuram and 18 KM from Srikakulam town. It was known as Salivatika (meaning rice emporium in Telugu). But many called it “Salya petika” or "Salya Hundi"(meaning box of bones or relics in Odia).

Buddhist Monuments
There are a number of Buddhist stupas and a huge monastic complex on a hillock amidst scenic surroundings. The site was first discovered by Gidugu Venkata Rama Murthy in 1919. Four stupas, relic caskets, and architectural shrines were discovered during digging performed by state authorities, as well as sculptures of Buddhist deities Mareechi and Tara. All of the remnants were built between the 2nd century and 12th century, reflecting the different times of Buddhism: Mahayana, Theravada and Vajrayana. Buddhism spread to Sumatra and other far-eastern countries from here. 

Salihundam is one of the main Buddhist excavation sites, showing evidence that Buddhism thrived in the local area during the 2nd and 3rd centuries.

See also 
Rajgir
Sanchi
Vaishali
Kapilvastu
Kushinagar
Nalanda
Sravasti
Aianta and Ellora Caves
Amaravati
Bavikonda
Bodh Gaya
Nagarjunakonda
Sarnath
Thotlakonda
Ghantasala

Gallery

References

Villages in Srikakulam district
Archaeological sites in Andhra Pradesh
Stupas in India
Buddhist sites in Andhra Pradesh
Buildings and structures in Srikakulam district
Uttarandhra